Deula railway station is a Kolkata Suburban Railway Station on the Diamond Harbour Branch line. It is under the jurisdiction of the Sealdah railway division in the Eastern Railway zone of the Indian Railways. Deula railway station is situated beside Station Road at Nazra, Deula, South 24 Parganas district in the Indian state of West Bengal.

History

Electrification

Station complex
The platform is very much well sheltered. The station possesses many facilities including water and sanitation. There is a proper approach road to this station.

References

Railway stations in South 24 Parganas district
Sealdah railway division
Kolkata Suburban Railway stations
Railway stations in India opened in 1883
1883 establishments in the British Empire